Chahar Suq or Chehar Suq may refer to:
 Chahar Suq, Hamadan
 Chahar Suq, Razavi Khorasan
Chahar Suq And Haji Muhammad Husayn Mosque